Chris Williamson may refer to:

 Chris Williamson (politician) (born 1956), British politician, former MP for Derby North
 Chris Williamson (alpine skier) (born 1972), Canadian alpine skier and Paralympic Champion
 Chris Williamson (American football) (born 1997), American football cornerback
 Chris Williamson (TV personality) (born 1987), contestant on Love Island
 Chris Williamson, British architect who co-founded Weston Williamson
 Crissy Criss (Chris Williamson, born 1987), British DJ, radio producer and presenter

See also
 Cris Williamson (born 1947), American feminist singer-songwriter